Wesley Eisold (born February 15, 1979) is an American musician, poet and author. He records music under the name Cold Cave, and runs the publishing house Heartworm Press.

Career
Wesley Eisold is the vocalist of the synthpop darkwave band Cold Cave as well as the hardcore punk group American Nightmare from 1998 - 2004, 2010–present, and previously of Some Girls, XO Skeletons and Ye Olde Maids.

In 2006, Eisold was published in the Columbia Journal. Also in 2006, Eisold founded the independent publishing company, Heartworm Press, because of his interest in writing and bringing zines to shows. He listed Exact Change, Grove Press, 2.13.61 and New Directions Publishing as influential publishers. Heartworm has released Eisold's own writing, as well as  Boyd Rice, Eric Paul, Jonathan Shaw,  Genesis P-Orridge and Richard Brautigan. In August 2007, he published his first collection of poems and prose, Deathbeds in his own publishing company Heartworms.

Since 2007 Eisold has been performing his music under the name Cold Cave, which represents his first venture into instrumentation. Eisold was born with one hand which led him to electronic music. After a public row over alleged plagiarism, Eisold settled out of court and has been given songwriting credits for Fall Out Boy's songs "The Carpal Tunnel of Love", "Golden", and "Bang the Doldrums" from the album Infinity on High.
On Fall Out Boy's 2005 album, From Under the Cork Tree, Eisold is credited as 'Inspirador.

In 2009, the Guardian wrote "Wesley Eisold is an absolutely new, young god of nihilism and despair – he brilliantly captures Cold Cave's aesthetic: the Morrissey of How Soon Is Now wailing over Nitzer Ebb beats and New Order melodies."

In 2010 Eisold said in an interview that missing a hand ruled out playing guitar and drums as instruments, so he began to try "making music with synths and pedals". He also noted that his songwriting process had changed after removing himself from the traditional band scene, and writing alone by himself.

In 2011 and 2012, Eisold performed live as a member of Prurient.

He has performed in less traditional music venues such as the Solomon R. Guggenheim Museum and the Getty Center.

Collaborations

As of 2009, Eisold had worked with Eric Paul of Arab On Radar's poetry collection, I Offered Myself As The Sea, as well as Genesis P-Orridge, Jonathan Shaw, Chris Leo, and Max G. Morton.
Eisold produced and recorded songs on Boyd Rice's 2012 album, Back To Mono, released on Mute Records. Several Cold Cave appearances were cancelled, because of Boyd Rice's controversial ties to Nazism, Satanism, and accusations of misogyny. They collaborated live in 2013.

In 2014, Eisold collaborated with Russian/American fashion designer Alexandre Plokhov on a shirt design for his Fall/Winter 2014 collection.

Also in 2014, Eisold collaborated with techno musician Black Asteroid and fashion designer Rick Owens on the Black Asteroid release and video of the song 'Black Moon.' 

In 2015, Eisold collaborated with Genesis Breyer P-Orridge of  Throbbing Gristle  and  Psychic TV on a recording entitled 'Rebellion Is Over.'

Personal life
Eisold has said in 2013 that he has been an outsider and had depression all his life.
His partner Amy Lee has been playing the synthesizer alongside him since 2012. They live in Los Angeles and have a son named Rainer Lee Eisold, born November 20, 2015.

Discography
 American Nightmare/Give Up the Ghost - 4 Song Demo Tape/7" (2000) - Self Released/Malfunction
 American Nightmare - S/T 7-inch (2000) - Bridge 9 Records
 American Nightmare - The Sun Isn't Getting Any Brighter 7-inch (2001) - Bridge 9 Records
 American Nightmare/Give Up the Ghost - Background Music CD/LP (2001) - Equal Vision Records
 American Nightmare - Black on Black: A Tribute to Black Flag (song: Depression) (2002) - Initial
 American Nightmare - Love American Demos 2002-2003 - Unreleased
 Anti Aquarian - Chrome Jesus Cassette (2010) - Hospital Productions
 Cold Cave - Coma Potion 12-inch (2008) - Heartworm Press
 Cold Cave - The Trees Grew Emotions And Died 12-inch(2008) - Dais Records
 Cold Cave - Painted Nails 7-inch (2008) - Hospital Productions
 Cold Cave - Blessure Grave/Crocodile 3-way split 7-inch (2008) - Down In The Ground
 Cold Cave - Electronic Dreams Cassette (2009) - Heartworm Press
 Cold Cave - Cremations CD/12-inch (2009) - Hospital Productions
 Cold Cave - New Morale Leadership Cassette (2010) - Hospital Productions
 Cold Cave - Prurient Collaboration - Stars explode Cassette/12" (2009) - Hospital Productions
 Cold Cave - Easel and Ruby 12-inch Single (2009) - What's Your Rupture?
 Cold Cave - Love Comes Close CD/12" (2009) - Heartworm Press
 Cold Cave - The Laurels 12-inch Single (2009) - Big Love
 Cold Cave - Death Comes Close 12-inch (2009) - Matador Records
 Cold Cave - Love Comes Close 12-inch Re-Press (2009) - Matador Records
 Cold Cave - Cherish the Light Years (2011) - Matador Records
 Cold Cave - A Little Death to Laugh 7-inch (2012) - Heartworm Press
 Cold Cave - Oceans With No End 7-inch (2013) - Deathwish
 Cold Cave - Black Boots 7-inch (2013) - Heartworm Press
 Cold Cave - God Made the World 7-inch (2013) - Heartworm Press
 Cold Cave - Nausea, the Earth and Me- Digital Single (2013) - Heartworm Press
 Cold Cave - Full Cold Moon CD (2014) - Heartworm Press
 Cold Cave - Rebellion Is Over (2015) - Heartworm Press / Dais Records
 Cold Cave - Nothing Is True But You 7-inch (2015) - Heartworm Press
 Cold Cave - The Idea of Love 7-inch (2016) - Heartworm Press
 Cold Cave - You & Me & Infinity 10-inch (2018) - Heartworm Press
 Give Up the Ghost - Love American CD-EP (2003) - Bridge 9 Records/Equal Vision Records
 Give Up the Ghost - We're Down Til We're Underground CD/LP (2003) - Equal Vision 
 Give Up the Ghost - Live in London 7-inch (2003) - Bridge 9 Records
 Give Up the Ghost - Year One CD/2×7″ (2004) - Reflections Records/Bridge 9 Records
 Some Girls - "We'll Let You Know" demo (2002)- Self Released
 Some Girls - The Rains EP EP (2002)- Deathwish
 Some Girls - The Blues EP EP  (2002)- Deathwish
 Some Girls - All My Friends Are Going Death CD/LP (2003)- Deathwish/Three One G
 Some Girls - The DNA Will Have Its Say EP (2005)- Three One G
 Some Girls - Heaven's Pregnant Teens CD/LP (2006)- Epitaph/Three One G
 Some Girls - BBC Session
 Taylor Bow - Thin Air LP (2009)- Youth Attack!
 XO Skeletons - Live From Planet Death (demo) (2005) - Heartworm Press
 XO Skeletons - Asthmagasm EP (2006) - Malfunction
 XO Skeletons - Bored By Heaven Digital/12" (2008) - self-released
 Ye Olde Maids - s/t Cassette (2007) - Heartworm Press
 Ye Olde Maids contributed a track to Nihil Underground's "Decades of Decay" noise/power electronics compilation.
 Ye Olde Maids - God Blesses Us, Mother Dresses Us 12-inch (2009) - Art Fag
 American Nightmare - American Nightmare (2018, Rise Records)

References

External links

American punk rock singers
Living people
1979 births
American synth-pop musicians
Dark wave musicians
Singers from Virginia
Musicians from Virginia Beach, Virginia
American people with disabilities
Amputee musicians
21st-century American keyboardists
21st-century American singers